The Church of St Michael and All Angels in Somerton, Somerset, England dates from the 13th century and has been designated as a Grade I listed building.

History

The chapel began as a daughter church of Queen Camel and belonged to the Crown, as did most in the area until the time of Empress Maud. However, the growth of Somerton in the 12th century likely pressured them to try to improve the inferior status of their church. The Empress allowed them a grant and therefore c. 1140, the church was given burial rights, making it, in its turn, a mother church, with the vicar being appointed by the monks of Muchelney Abbey.

The Anglican Church underwent a major reshaping in the mid 15th century, and further restoration in 1889. It is built of local lias stone cut and squared, with Hamstone dressing.

It is notable for a carved roof, with dragons (Wyverns - the symbol for the county of Somerset; Somerton was at one time the county town), angels, and two small cider barrels purportedly carved by the monks of Muchelney Abbey.  Sir John Betjeman was also inspired by an inscription on the candelabra. The church is quite plain on the outside but inside is one of the finest wooden carved roofs in the county. It is shallow pitched with massive, richly decorated tie beams and short king posts. The whole area of the roof is divided into square carved panels set in the framework of the structural timbers which are decorated with carved bosses where they intersect. There are 640 panels each carved with the same quatrefoil design. In the triangular spaces above each beam are twenty-two dragons facing each other in pairs. It is said there are bullet holes in the timbers, caused by soldiers who camped in the church in 1646 before the Battle of Langport. The 17th century pulpit and altar table are Jacobean woodwork.

Incumbents

See also

 List of Grade I listed buildings in South Somerset
 List of towers in Somerset
 List of ecclesiastical parishes in the Diocese of Bath and Wells

References

13th-century church buildings in England
Church of England church buildings in South Somerset
Grade I listed churches in Somerset
Grade I listed buildings in South Somerset
Somerton, Somerset